Denou Koffi (born 4 July 1952) is a Togolese athlete. He competed in the men's triple jump at the 1984 Summer Olympics.

References

External links
 

1952 births
Living people
Athletes (track and field) at the 1984 Summer Olympics
Togolese male triple jumpers
Olympic athletes of Togo
Place of birth missing (living people)
21st-century Togolese people